Love You Just The Same is a 2003 rock album by Texan rock band Centro-Matic.

Track listing 
 Mighty Midshipman
 Flashes and Cables
 Argonne Limit Co.
 Biology Tricks
 Strahan Has Corralled the Freaks
 All the Lightning Rods
 Reset Anytime
 Picking Up Too Fast
 Spiraling Sideways
 Supercar
 Silver Plate Complaints
 Breathe Deep Not Loud
 Without You

Personnel 
 Will Johnson - vocals, guitars
 Scott Danbom - vocals, keyboards, violin
 Mark Hedman - bass
 Matt Pence - drums

References
[ Allmusic album review]

External links
Official site

Centro-Matic albums
2003 albums